The 1981 British motorcycle Grand Prix was the eleventh round of the 1981 Grand Prix motorcycle racing season. It took place on the weekend of 31–2 August 1981 at the Silverstone Circuit.

Classification

500 cc

References

British motorcycle Grand Prix
British
Motorcycle Grand Prix
British motorcycle Grand Prix